Unformal was an Azerbaijani rock band from Baku, performing in Azeri and in English as well.

Unformal was founded in 2000 by Rustam Mammadov and Novruz Ismayilov. During the first years of its existence it was known as a hard rock band. In 2001 Unformal won Azerbaijan Rock Award Competition. In 2006 vocalist Delya and electro-guitar performer Looper joined to the band. Since then Unformal changed and now it is an alternative rock band. In March 2007 the single “Sonsuz yol” acclaimed by listeners, becoming the top-ranked song on the Azerbaijani, Ukrainian and Turkish charts.

Unformal also took place in national final of Azerbaijan in Eurovision Song Contest 2008 and became second after Elnur Huseynov and Samir Javadzadeh.

Band members 

 Evgeniy Manukhin - drums;
 Farida Nelson - bass, piano, backing vocal
 Dilara Kazimova - vocal
 Igor Garanin (LOOPer) - guitar, synth, programming
 Yashar Bakhish - guitar
 Toro - keyboard

Discography

Norm of Reality (2003, demo)
Unformal (2005,demo)

External links
"Sonsuz yol" music video
"Sovereignty" music video

Azerbaijani musical groups
Azerbaijani alternative rock groups
Musical groups established in 2000
Musical groups disestablished in 2009
2000 establishments in Azerbaijan
Azerbaijani rock music groups